Onofre is a genus of Brazilian jumping spiders that was first described by G. R. S. Ruiz & Antônio Domingos Brescovit in 2007.  it contains only three species, found in the Amazon basin of Brazil: O. carnifex, O. necator, and O. sibilans. They are related to members of Chira, and the three species were described from the states of Mato Grosso and Pará. The generic name is a common man's name in Brazil.

References

Salticidae genera
Endemic fauna of Brazil
Salticidae
Spiders of Brazil